Prismosticta fenestrata is a moth in the family Endromidae first described by Arthur Gardiner Butler in 1880. It is found in China (Zhejiang, Xizang), Taiwan, India and Nepal.

Mature larvae vary in colour from greenish yellow to darkish brown marked with darker lines and paler stripes. Pupation takes place in a small cocoon of brown silk, spun on a twig or in a clump of leaves.

References

Moths described in 1880
Prismosticta